The 18th Army (German: 18. Armee) was a World War II field army in the German Wehrmacht.

Formed in November 1939 in Military Region (Wehrkreis) VI, the 18th Army was part of the offensive into the Netherlands (Battle of the Netherlands) and Belgium (Battle of Belgium) during Fall Gelb and later moved into France in 1940.  The 18th Army was then moved East and participated in Operation Barbarossa in 1941.

The Army was a part of the Army Group North until early 1945, when it was subordinated to Army Group Kurland.  In October 1944, the army was encircled by the Red Army offensives and spent the remainder of the war in the Courland Pocket.

Commanders

Chiefs of the Generalstab
 5 November 1939 – 10 December 1940 Generalmajor Erich Marcks
 10 December 1940 – 19 January 1941 Generalmajor Wilhelm Hasse
 19 January 1941 – 17 November 1942 Generalmajor Dr. Ing. h.c. Kurt Waeger
 24 November 1942 – 1 December 1943 Generalmajor Hans Speth
 1 December 1943 – 25 January 1945 Generalmajor Friedrich Foertsch
 25 January 1945 – 5 March 1945 Oberst i.G. Wilhelm Hetzel
 5 March 1945 – 10(!) May 1945 Generalmajor Ernst Merk

Orders of Battle

10 May 1940
 XXVI Army Corps
 256th Infantry Division
 254th Infantry Division
 SS "Der Führer" Regiment
 X Army Corps
 SS "Adolf Hitler" Regiment
 227th Infantry Division
 207th Infantry Division
 1st Cavalry Division
 Direct control of Army Headquarters
 SS "Verfügungstruppe" Division
 9th Panzer Division
 208th Infantry Division
 225th Infantry Division

1 July 1941
 XXXVIII Army Corps
 58th Infantry Division
 291st Infantry Division
 XXVI Army Corps
 1st Infantry Division
 61st Infantry Division
 217th Infantry Division
 I Army Corps
 11th Infantry Division
 21st Infantry Division

September 1941
 L Army Corps
 LIV Army Corps
 XXVI Army Corps
 XXVIII Army Corps
 I Army Corps

15 July 1944
 XVIII Army Corps
 12th Luftwaffe Division
 Kampfgruppe Hoefer
 21st Infantry Division
 30th Infantry Division
 XXXVIII Army Corps
 121st Infantry Division
 32nd Infantry Division
 21st Luftwaffe Division
 83rd Infantry Division
 L Army Corps
 218th Infantry Division
 19th Waffen Grenadier Division of the SS (2nd Latvian)
 126th Infantry Division
 93rd Infantry Division
 15th Waffen Grenadier Division of the SS (1st Latvian)
 Kampfgruppe Streckenbach
 Direct control of Army Headquarters
 Headquarters VI SS Corps
 207th Security Division
 300th Division zbV (Estonian border guard units)

12 April 1945
 L Army Corps
 11th Infantry Division
 290th Infantry Division
 II Army Corps
 563rd Volksgrenadier Division
 126th Infantry Division
 263rd Infantry Division
 87th Infantry Division
 I Army Corps
 225th Infantry Division
 132nd Infantry Division
 X Army Corps
 30th Infantry Division
 121st Infantry Division
 Kampfgruppe (Ernst) Gise
 Direct control of Army Headquarters
 52nd Security Division
 14th Panzer Division

References

18
Military units and formations established in 1939
Military units and formations disestablished in 1945
1939 establishments in Germany